Jimmy Connors defeated Ivan Lendl in the final, 6–3, 6–2, 4–6, 6–4 to win the men's singles tennis title at the 1982 US Open.

John McEnroe was the three-time defending champion, but lost in the semifinals to Lendl.

Seeds
The seeded players are listed below. Jimmy Connors is the champion; others show the round in which they were eliminated.

  John McEnroe (semifinalist)
  Jimmy Connors (champion)
  Ivan Lendl (finalist)
  Guillermo Vilas (semifinalist)
  Vitas Gerulaitis (first round)
  Gene Mayer (quarterfinalist)
  José Luis Clerc (first round)
  Eliot Teltscher (fourth round)
  Yannick Noah (fourth round)
  Johan Kriek (third round)
  Mats Wilander (fourth round)
  Steve Denton (fourth round)
  Mark Edmondson (second round)
  Brian Teacher (second round)
  Raúl Ramírez (second round)
  Roscoe Tanner (second round)

Draw

Key
 Q = Qualifier
 WC = Wild card
 LL = Lucky loser
 r = Retired

Finals

Section 1

Section 2

Section 3

Section 4

Section 5

Section 6

Section 7

Section 8

External links
 Association of Tennis Professionals (ATP) – 1982 US Open Men's Singles draw
1982 US Open – Men's draws and results at the International Tennis Federation

Men's singles
US Open (tennis) by year – Men's singles